Abas or ABAS may refer to:

People
Abas (sophist), an ancient Greek sophist and rhetorician
Abas, the ancient writer of a work entitled Troia from which Maurus Servius Honoratus (ad Aen. ix. 264) has preserved a fragment
Abas I of Armenia, king of Armenia from 928 to 953
Abas (name)

Other uses
Abas River, a river of the Caucasus
Battle of the Abas, a battle at the river in 65 BCE
Abas Business Software, an enterprise resource planning and e-business application from ABAS Software AG
Abas unipunctata, a species of planthopper and the only member of the animal genus Abas
Abas (diatom), an extinct genus of algae
Abas (mythology), several individuals in Greek and Roman mythology

See also
ABA (disambiguation)
Aba (disambiguation)
Abba (disambiguation)
 Ab (Semitic)